Sayyid Kamal Kharazi (born 1 December 1944) is an Iranian reformist politician and diplomat who was the Minister of Foreign Affairs from 20 August 1997 to 24 August 2005 as appointed by President Mohammad Khatami serving for eight years. He was replaced by Manouchehr Mottaki who was appointed by the next President Mahmoud Ahmadinejad. He is currently member of the Expediency Discernment Council.

Early life and education
Kharazi was born in Tehran in 1944. He got his Bachelor degree in Arabic language and literature, and after receiving his master's degree in education at the University of Tehran, he spent a year (1975–1976) as teaching fellow at the University of Houston, where he received a PhD in industrial psychology.

Career

Kharazi has been a Professor of Management and Educational Psychology at Tehran University since 1983. Kharazi was a founding member of the Islamic Research Institute in London.

Kharazi has held a number of governmental, diplomatic and academic posts and headed Iranian delegations at numerous international conferences, most importantly at the Earth Summit held in Rio de Janeiro in 1992. For several years Kharazi presented the official Iranian position on TV and at university campuses in the United States and Europe, and has written extensively on foreign policy issues. He had extensive experience in guiding the media during the early days of Iran's Iranian Revolution.

From July 1980 to September 1989, he was the President of the Islamic Republic News Agency. On 18 September 1980, the Iran–Iraq War broke out, and Kharazi served as a member of the Supreme Defense Council of Iran and headed the War Information Headquarters and served as a military spokesman for most of the war (from September 1980 to September 1988).

During the first months after the Iranian Revolution, Kharazi served as the Vice-President of Iranian National Television (March to August 1979) for the new Islamic state. He then served as the Vice-Minister for Political Affairs of the Ministry of Foreign Affairs (from August 1979 to March 1980) and as the Managing Director of the Center for Intellectual Development of Children and Young Adults (from August 1979 to July 1981).
Previously, he represented Iran at the United Nations from 1989 to 1997.

See also

Mohsen Kharrazi
Ministry of Foreign Affairs of Iran

References

|-

|-

|-

1944 births
Living people
Politicians from Tehran
Foreign ministers of Iran
University of Tehran alumni
University of Houston alumni
20th-century Iranian politicians
21st-century Iranian politicians